Nimi may refer to

 Nimi (Mithila king)
 Nimi language
 Niimi, Okayama
 Non-Instrumental Movement Inhibition (embodied cognitive phenomenon relating to psychological engagement)